Tell Umm el-'Amr (also known as Saint Hilarion Monastery) is an ancient Christian monastery close to Deir al-Balah in the Gaza Strip.

History and archaeology
The archaeological remains at Tell Umm el-'Amr span more than four centuries, from the Late Roman to the Umayyad period, and are characterized by five successive churches, bath and sanctuary complexes, geometric mosaics, and an expansive crypt. The site's oldest building, dating to the fourth century, is named for Hilarion, a native of the Gaza region and the father of Palestinian monasticism. The site was abandoned after a seventh-century earthquake and rediscovered by local archaeologists in 1999.

Current state
According to the Ministry of Tourism in Gaza, Tell Umm el-'Amr is in dire need of preservation. Current preservation efforts are plagued by war and conflict in the region, as well as a shortage of materials and equipment needed for excavation. The site was included on the 2012 World Monuments Watch and is classified as "Rescue Needed" by Global Heritage Network.

References

External links
Tell Umm el-'Amr on Global Heritage Network
World Monuments Fund 2012 Watch List

 Archaeological sites in the Gaza Strip
 Christian monasteries in the Gaza Strip
 Eastern Orthodox monasteries in Asia
Roman sites in Asia